Pfalz, Pfälzer, or Pfälzisch are German words referring to Palatinate.

They may refer to:

Places 
Pfalz, the Palatinate (region) of Germany
Nordpfalz, the North Palatinate
Vorderpfalz, the  Anterior Palatinate
Südpfalz, the  South Palatinate
Westpfalz, the  West Palatinate
Pfalz, the Palatinate wine region of Germany
Pfälzische Weinkönigin, the Palatine Wine Queen elected representative of the region
the Pfalz, nickname for Pfalzgrafenstein Castle, Germany
Pfälzerwald, the Palatinate Forest 
Rheinland-Pfalz, the current federal German state of Rhineland-Palatinate

Historic states 
Kurpfalz, the Electoral Palatinate of the Holy Roman Empire. Historic houses and states include:
Pfalz-Birkenfeld, the House of Palatinate-Birkenfeld
Pfalz-Birkenfeld-Bischweiler
Pfalz-Birkenfeld-Gelnhausen
Pfalz-Birkenfeld-Zweibrücken
Pfalz-Kleeburg
Pfalz-Landsberg
Pfalz-Lautern
Pfalz-Mosbach
Pfalz-Mosbach-Neumarkt
Pfalz-Neuburg
Pfalz-Palatinate-Neumarkt, the House of Palatinate-Neumarkt
Pfalz-Simmern, the House of Palatinate-Simmern
Pfalz-Simmern-Zweibrücken
Pfalz-Simmern-Kaiserslautern
Pfalz-Simmern-Sponheim
Pfalz-Sulzbach
Pfalz-Sulzbach-Hilpoltstein
Pfalz-Zweibrücken
Pfalz-Zweibrücken-Birkenfeld
Pfalz-Zweibrücken-Vohenstrauss-Parkstein

People 
Elisabeth-Charlotte Wittelsbach von Pfalz (1652-1722)
Friedrich V von der Pfalz (1596-1632)
Heinrich Friedrich von der Pfalz (1614-29)
Karl I. Ludwig von der Pfalz (1617-80)
Ludwig I von Pfalz-Zweibrücken (1424-89)
Sophie von der Pfalz (1630-1714)
Wolfgang Wilhelm von Pfalz-Neuburg (1578-1653)

Transportation

Aircraft 
Pfalz Flugzeugwerke, a German World War I aircraft manufacturer
Pfalz D.III, 1917 biplane fighter
Pfalz D.VI, 1917 sesquiplane fighter aircraft not put into production
Pfalz D.VII, late 1917 biplane fighter not put into production
Pfalz D.VIII, 1918 biplane fighter
Pfalz D.XII, 1918 biplane fighter 
Pfalz D.XV, 1918 single seat biplane fighter
Pfalz Dr.I, 1917 triplane fighter
Pfalz Dr.II, 1917 triplane fighter prototype

Rail 
Pfalz, a German steam locomotive preserved at the Neustadt/Weinstrasse Railway Museum
Pfälzische Nordbahn, the Palatine Northern Railway
Pfälzische Ludwigsbahn, historic name for the Mannheim–Saarbrücken railway
Pfälzische Maximiliansbahn, historic name for the Neustadt–Wissembourg railway

Ships 
SS Pfalz, the name for three different steamships operated by German shipping company Norddeutscher Lloyd

Other uses 
Pfälzisch, a dialect of the German language

See also 
Falz (disambiguation)
Pfaltz (disambiguation)

German words and phrases
German-language surnames